Akmenė Free Economic Zone is a special economic zone located in Akmenė, Lithuania. It is 98.6 ha area, which was established in 2012.

FEZ companies 

A wood industry group Vakarų Medienos Grupė (VMG) will invest 140M EUR to build a new particle board factory in 2020 and a new furniture production facility at a later stage.

Tax incentives

References

Free economic zones of Lithuania
Akmenė
2012 establishments in Lithuania